Lee Dong-Myung (Hangul: 이동명;  born 4 October 1987) is a South Korea footballer who currently plays for Daegu FC in K League Challenge.

He previously played for Busan I'Park, Jeju United, Fagiano Okayama and Oita Trinita.

Lee joined J2 League side Oita Trinita on loan until 31 January 2012.

External links

 
Guardian's Stats Centre

Association football forwards
South Korean footballers
Jeju United FC players
Busan IPark players
Fagiano Okayama players
Oita Trinita players
Daegu FC players
K League 1 players
K League 2 players
J2 League players
1987 births
Living people
South Korean expatriate sportspeople in Japan
Expatriate footballers in Japan
South Korean expatriate footballers